Bis(diethylamino)chlorophosphine is an organophosphorus compound with the formula (Et2N)2PCl (Et = ethyl).  A colorless liquid, it serves as a masked source of PCl2+.

Synthesis and reactions
The compound is prepared by treatment of phosphorus trichloride with diethylamine:
4 Et2NH  +  PCl3  →  (Et2N)2PCl  +  2 Et2NH2Cl
Illustrative of its utility is the synthesis of 1,2-bis(dichlorophosphino)benzene.  The synthesis involves sequential lithiation of 1,2-dibromobenzene followed by treatment with (Et2N)2PCl:
C6H4Br2  +  BuLi  →   C6H4(Br)Li  +  BuBr
C6H4(Br)Li  +  (Et2N)2PCl  →   C6H4(Br)(P(NEt2)2)  +  LiCl
C6H4(Br)(P(NEt2)2)  +  BuLi  →   C6H4(Li)(P(NEt2)2)  +  BuBr
C6H4(Li)(P(NEt2)2)  +  (Et2N)2PCl  →   C6H4[P(NEt2)2]2  +  LiCl

Finally, the amino substituents are removed using hydrogen chloride:
C6H4[P(NEt2)2]2  +  8 HCl  →   C6H4(PCl2)2  +  4 Et2NH2Cl

References

Phosphines